Annika Herlitz, (born 22 September 1984) is a Swedish singer, musical performer, and voice actress. She provided the Swedish voice for the snow queen Elsa in the Walt Disney film Frozen. The film was released in Sweden on 31 January 2014. Herlitz performed the song from Frozen Let It Go at Allsång på Skansen.

Herlitz participated in Melodifestivalen 2015 with the song "Ett andetag".

Discography

Singles

References 

Living people
Swedish pop singers
Swedish voice actresses
1984 births
21st-century Swedish singers
21st-century Swedish women singers
Melodifestivalen contestants of 2015